The 1968 Los Angeles Dodgers had a 76–86 record and finished in seventh place in the National League standings, 21 games behind the St. Louis Cardinals.  After the season, the Dodgers underwent some changes among the team management when long time general manager Buzzie Bavasi resigned to take over the expansion San Diego Padres. He was replaced by team vice-president Fresco Thompson. However, Thompson was diagnosed with cancer weeks after taking the job and died in November. Al Campanis became the new general manager for the following season.

Offseason 
 November 28, 1967: John Roseboro, Ron Perranoski and Bob Miller were traded by the Dodgers to the Minnesota Twins for Mudcat Grant and Zoilo Versalles.
 November 30, 1967: Gene Michael was purchased from the Dodgers by the New York Yankees.
 November 30, 1967: Lou Johnson was traded by the Dodgers to the Chicago Cubs for Paul Popovich.
 February 13, 1968: Ron Hunt and Nate Oliver were traded by the Dodgers to the San Francisco Giants for Tom Haller and Frank Kasheta (minors).
 March 26, 1968: Rocky Colavito was purchased by the Dodgers from the Chicago White Sox.

Regular season

Season standings

Record vs. opponents

Opening Day lineup

Notable transactions 
 April 3, 1968: Hank Aguirre was acquired by the Dodgers from the Detroit Tigers for cash and a player to be named later. The Tigers completed the deal by sending Fred Moulder (minors) to the Dodgers on April 4.
 April 23, 1968: Jim Hickman and Phil Regan were traded by the Dodgers to the Chicago Cubs for Ted Savage and Jim Ellis.
 July 11, 1968: Rocky Colavito was released by the Dodgers.

Roster

Player stats

Batting

Starters by position 
Note: Pos = Position; G = Games played; AB = At bats; H = Hits; Avg. = Batting average; HR = Home runs; RBI = Runs batted in

Other batters 
Note: G = Games played; AB = At bats; H = Hits; Avg. = Batting average; HR = Home runs; RBI = Runs batted in

Pitching

Starting pitchers 
Note: G = Games pitched; IP = Innings pitched; W = Wins; L = Losses; ERA = Earned run average; SO = Strikeouts

Relief pitchers 
Note: G = Games pitched; W = Wins; L = Losses; SV = Saves; ERA = Earned run average; SO = Strikeouts

Awards and honors 
Gold Glove Award
Wes Parker
TSN Fireman of the Year Award
Phil Regan
NL Player of the Month
Don Drysdale (May 1968)

All-Stars 
1968 Major League Baseball All-Star Game
Don Drysdale, starter
Tom Haller, reserve

Farm system 

LEAGUE CHAMPIONS: Tri-City, Ogden

1968 Major League Baseball Draft

This was the fourth year of a Major League Baseball Draft.  The Dodgers drafted 78 players in the June draft and 23 in the January draft. This was one of the Dodgers most successful drafts in history as they drafted Steve Garvey, Ron Cey, Davey Lopes and Bobby Valentine in this draft.

Notes

References 
Baseball-Reference season page
Baseball Almanac season page

External links 
1968 Los Angeles Dodgers uniform
Los Angeles Dodgers official web site

Los Angeles Dodgers seasons
Los Angeles Dodgers season
Los Angel